Park Min-Chul (born 23 December 1974) is a Korean handball player who competed in the 2000 Summer Olympics and in the 2004 Summer Olympics.

References

1974 births
Living people
South Korean male handball players
Olympic handball players of South Korea
Handball players at the 2000 Summer Olympics
Handball players at the 2004 Summer Olympics
Asian Games medalists in handball
Handball players at the 2002 Asian Games
Asian Games gold medalists for South Korea
Medalists at the 2002 Asian Games